Eccleta is a genus of moths of the family Noctuidae.

Species
 Eccleta xuthophanes Turner, 1902

References
Natural History Museum Lepidoptera genus database
Eccleta at funet

Hadeninae